The Walnut Grove is a historic mansion in Gallatin, Tennessee, U.S.. It was built circa 1800, and expanded in the 1820s. The original owner was Charles Elliott, and his brother Elliott lived at Wall Spring nearby. It includes a portico, and a staircase designed in the Federal style. It has been listed on the National Register of Historic Places since December 29, 1978.

References

Houses on the National Register of Historic Places in Tennessee
Houses completed in 1800
Buildings and structures in Sumner County, Tennessee